Dance Bangla Dance is a Bengali reality show program, which airs in Zee Bangla. It was later remade in Hindi as Dance India Dance. It first started on 6 April 2007, following Dance India Dance by Mithun Chakraborty, who had been the show's host from the beginning.

This show has made national record in 2012 by Limca Book of Records for making 100 non-stop episodes in the sixth season. 

According to a news article published in Anandabazar Patrika, Ananda Plus on 6 December 2013, the 2014 season will not be judged by Chakraborty. In December 2013, it was announced on fellow Zee Bangla show Dadagiri that Dev will be a judge on it in season 8. Some of the other celebrities who have judged the show are Swastika Mukherjee, Ananya Chatterjee.

Now upcoming season in DBD12, in new format, new anchor Ankush Hazra, judges Mouni Roy, Srabanti Chatterjee, and Subhashree Ganguly, returning grand-master Mithun Chakraborty.

Seasons

Grand Masters
Mithun Chakraborty (2007–2013, 2023).
In its season 12 Mithun Chakraborty again returned as Mahaguru aka Grand Master

Since its season 9 there are no grandmasters only 3 Judges along with hosts.

Hosts
The show was actually first hosted by Mir. Then, it had various child hosts since its beginning. In its Season 8 and Season 11 the show is hosted by  seniors. In Season 11, actor Vikram Chatterjee and Ankush Hazra co hosted the show. Actor Abir Chatterjee replaced Ankush Hazra as host because Ankush has been suffering from high fever and had been severely ill. Ditipriya Roy also replaced Ankush Hazra for one episode due to some personal reasons.

 Mir Afsar Ali (Season 1)
Oindrila Saha
Aritra Dutta Banik 
Tathoi Deb
Vicky Nandy (Season 8)
 Raktim Samanta
Raktima
Bilash
Shayree
Ankush Hazra (Season 11)
Vikram Chatterjee (Season 11)

Mentors
In its 11 season there are mentors. 4 respected dancers divided in two groups.
Group 1-Rimjhim Mitra and Soumili Biswas
Group 2- Om Sahani and Devlina Kumar. (Souraja Tagore replaced Devlina Kumar for few episodes)

References

Indian reality television series
Bengali-language television programming in India
Zee Bangla original programming